George Morgan (1854 – January 8, 1936) was an American actor and screenwriter. He wrote for more than 100 films between 1913 and 1940. He died in Philadelphia, Pennsylvania.

Selected filmography
Screenwriter

 Dick Tracy (1937)
 The Silent Code (1935)
 Badge of Honor (1934)
 When Lightning Strikes (1934)
 Her Forgotten Past (1933)
 The Lost Special (1932)
 The Devil Horse (1932)
 Human Targets (1932)
 Tangled Fortunes (1932)
 The Hurricane Express (1932)
 The Cyclone Kid (1931)
 Heroes of the Flames (1931)
 Finger Prints (1931)
 Quick Trigger Lee (1931)
 Headin' for Trouble (1931)
 The Pirate of Panama (1929)
 Smilin' Guns (1929)
 Wild Blood (1928)
 A Final Reckoning (1928)
 Two Outlaws (1928)
 Galloping Thunder (1927)
 The Silent Flyer (1926)
 The Winking Idol (1926)
 The Great Circus Mystery (1925)
 Romance and Rustlers (1925)
 Perils of the Yukon (1922)
 The Movie Trail (1921)
 Bandits Beware (1921)
 Crossed Clues (1921)
 Who Was the Man? (1921)
 The Cactus Kid (1921)
 Out o' Luck (1921)
 The Fightin' Fury (1921)
 Kickaroo (1921)
 The Saddle King (1921)
 Her Hour (1917)
 The Dilemma (1914)

Actor
 The Merchant of Venice (1916)

External links

1854 births
1936 deaths
American male screenwriters
Screenwriters from Delaware
Silent film screenwriters
20th-century American male writers
20th-century American screenwriters